WTZB (105.9 FM) is a commercial radio station located in Englewood, Florida, broadcasting to the Sarasota/Bradenton, Florida area. WTZB is airing a mainstream rock format as "Z105".

History
On February 1, 2016, WTZB changed their format from active rock (as "105.9 The Buzz") to classic rock, branded as "Z105".

On September, 23rd 2019 the station launched a live local morning show titled 'Frank's Garage'.

The HD2 Station is The Vinyl Experience.

Translators

References

External links
 Official Website

TZB
Active rock radio stations in the United States
Radio stations established in 1999
IHeartMedia radio stations
1999 establishments in Florida